The Thomas Fleming House is a historic house located in Sherborn, Massachusetts.

Description and history 
The -story wood-frame house was built c. 1850 by Thomas Fleming. It is a well-preserved modest Greek Revival house with a simple door surround. Fleming and his brothers practiced one of the town's cottage industries, willow weaving for the making of baskets and trinket boxes, that proliferated in Sherborn in the mid-19th century.

The house was listed on the National Register of Historic Places on January 3, 1986.

See also
National Register of Historic Places listings in Sherborn, Massachusetts

References

Houses on the National Register of Historic Places in Middlesex County, Massachusetts
Houses in Sherborn, Massachusetts
Greek Revival architecture in Massachusetts